Dame Gillian Gerda Brown  (10 August 1923 – 21 April 1999) was a British diplomat who was the second woman to be a British ambassador.

Early life
She was the elder daughter of Walter Henry Brown (1893/4–1956), a Ministry of Works civil servant, and his wife, Gerda Lois Brown, née Grenside (1885–1961), an artist. Her sister was the mycologist, Juliet Frankland.

Career
Brown graduated in French and German from Somerville College, Oxford just as reforms instigated by Ernest Bevin and Anthony Eden in 1943 were liberalising recruitment policies at the Foreign Office – later the Foreign and Commonwealth Office, FCO – which she joined in 1944. After service at Budapest, Washington, D.C. and the OECD in Paris, she was head of the Marine and Transport Department at the FCO 1967–70 and had to deal with the international aspects of the Torrey Canyon oil spill in March 1967.

Brown was Ambassador to Norway 1981–83; she was the second female British ambassador after Anne Warburton. In 1983 she retired from the diplomatic service and served on Civil Service selection boards and on the council of the Greenwich Forum. From 1988 to 1998 she was chairman of the Anglo-Norse Society in London which now annually awards the Dame Gillian Brown Postgraduate Scholarship in her memory.

Gill Brown was happy in Oslo: in command of her subject ... and in a country where her achievements as a professional woman were much respected. She reaped her reward when the Falklands crisis broke, and Norway became one of the first countries to ban Argentine imports (the argument that territorial disputes must not be settled by force went straight home in the only Nato country to share a land frontier with the Soviet Union). She was also held in high regard by her staff, in whose personal and professional affairs, and occasional problems, she took a practical and sympathetic interest — The Independent

Honours
Brown was appointed CMG in 1971 and made a Dame (female equivalent of Knight) of the Royal Victorian Order in 1981. The King of Norway awarded her the Grand Cross of the Order of St Olav. She was an honorary fellow of her alma mater, Somerville College, Oxford, and honorary LLD of the University of Bath.

References

Sources
BROWN, Dame Gillian (Gerda), Who Was Who, A & C Black, 1920–2014; online edn, Oxford University Press, April 2014
Dame Gillian Brown (obituary), The Times, London, 2 June 1999, page 21
Obituary: Dame Gillian Brown, The Independent, London, 6 May 1999

1923 births
1999 deaths
Alumni of Somerville College, Oxford
Ambassadors of the United Kingdom to Norway
Dames Commander of the Royal Victorian Order
Companions of the Order of St Michael and St George
British women ambassadors
Fellows of Somerville College, Oxford
British expatriates in the United States
British expatriates in Hungary
British expatriates in France